The Battle of Kampot was a major battle of the Vietnam War, also a part of the Cambodian Civil War. From February 26 to April 2, 1974, Cambodian government troops battled Khmer Rouge guerillas for the control of Kampot city.

The Battle of Kampot
The Khmer Rouge commenced their attack north of Kampot on February 26, pounding the city with 107mm rockets and 120mm mortars.

During the first week of fighting, elements of the Cambodian Army 12th and 68th Brigades abandoned their positions, while the 210th and 68th Battalions were deactivated after 300 soldiers deserted during the first day of the enemy onslaught. The desertions allowed the Khmer Rouge to capture the city water works, as a result, half of Kampot's inhabitants fled the city due to the dwindling water supply.

With support from the navy, air force and artillery units, the 12th and 20th Brigades of the Cambodian army counter-attacked the north-east. Rather than advance, the Cambodian government units developed a defensive posture as the Khmer Rouge's positions were strengthened. Between March 2-March 10 Kampot was further reinforced with six 105mm artillery pieces and two more battalions. On April 3, government defensive positions near Kampot airfield were abandoned after the Khmer Rouge completely isolated it.

Aftermath
Despite the Cambodian Army's heavy resistance, the Khmer Rouge eventually captured the city of Kampot on April 2. Both sides suffered heavy casualties during the fighting but many more civilians were rendered homeless. After the fall of Kampot, the Khmer Rouge launched another offensive to capture Oudong.

See also
 Battle of Oudong
 Cambodian Civil War
 Khmer National Armed Forces
 Khmer Rouge
 Operation Chenla I
 Operation Chenla II
 Weapons of the Cambodian Civil War

References
Kenneth Conboy, FANK: A History of the Cambodian Armed Forces, 1970-1975, Equinox Publishing (Asia) Pte Ltd, Djakarta 2011. 
Kenneth Conboy, Kenneth Bowra, and Mike Chappell, The War in Cambodia 1970-75, Men-at-arms series 209, Osprey Publishing Ltd, London 1989. 
Russell R. Ross (editor), Cambodia, a Country Study, Area Handbook Series (Third edition), Department of the Army, American University, Washington D.C. 1987.  
Sak Sutsakhan, The Khmer Republic at War and the Final Collapse, U.S. Army Center of Military History, Washington D.C. 1980. – available online at Part 1Part 2Part 3 Part 4.

Kampot
Kampot
1974 in Cambodia
Kampot province
Battlefields in Cambodia
Conflicts in 1974
February 1974 events in Asia
March 1974 events in Asia
April 1974 events in Asia